Marttinen is a Finnish surname. Notable people with the surname include:

Aati Marttinen (born 1997), Finnish footballer
Alpo K. Marttinen (1908–1975), Finnish colonel
Erkki Marttinen (born 1926), Finnish swimmer
Jyri Marttinen (born 1982), Finnish ice hockey player
Matias Marttinen, Finnish politician
Tauno Marttinen (1912–2008), Finnish composer

Finnish-language surnames